Miklós Skuta or Miki Skuta (born in Komárno, 3 January 1960) is a Slovak pianist and composer.

He was trained at the Bratislava Conservatory, completing studies in Paris under Claude Helffer. Skuta, a prize-winner at several Czechoslovakian and international competitions, was awarded a 3rd prize at the 1983 Maria Callas competition in Athen. He has been active as a concert pianist in Europe.

A free-lance pianist, since the late 80s he has grown involved with jazz and contemporary music.

References
  Warsaw Autumn
 Hudubné Centrum Slovakia

1960 births
Living people
Slovak classical pianists
Slovak composers
Male composers
21st-century classical pianists
Slovak male musicians